The Centre for Development of Advanced Computing (C-DAC) is an Indian autonomous scientific society, operating under the Ministry of Electronics and Information Technology.

History

CDAC was created in November 1987, initially as the Centre for Development of Advanced Computing Technology (C-DACT). In 1988, the US Government refused to sell India a Cray supercomputer  due to concerns about India using it to develop nuclear weapons. In response, India started development of its own supercomputer and C-DAC was created as part of this programme.

Dr Vijay Bhatkar was hired as the director of C-DAC. The project was given an initial run of three years and an initial funding of 30,00,00,000, the cost of a Cray supercomputer.

A prototype computer was benchmarked at the 1990 Zurich Super-computing Show. It demonstrated that India had the second most powerful, publicly demonstrated, supercomputer in the world after the United States.

The final result of the effort was the PARAM 8000, released in 1991. It is considered to be India's first supercomputer.

The National Centre for Software Technology, Electronic Research and Development Center and CEDTI were merged into C-DAC in 2003.

Research activities
Originally established to research and assemble High Performance Computers, the research of C-DAC now includes:

 High Performance Computing
 Grid Computing
 Cloud Computing
 Multilingual and Heritage Computing
 VLSI and Processor design
 Embedded Systems
 Speech and Natural Language Processing
 Information and Cyber Security
 Ubiquitous Computing
 Bioinformatics
 Geomatics
 Digital forensics
 Big data analytics
 Blockchain
 Health Informatics
 Quantum computing

Centers
C-DAC branches and training centers include:

 C-DAC Pune (Headquarters)
 C-DAC Mumbai
 C-DAC Bangalore
 C-DAC Chennai
 C-DAC Delhi
 C-DAC Kolkata
 C-DAC Patna
 C-DAC Mohali
 C-DAC Noida
 C-DAC Hyderabad
 C-DAC Thiruvananthapuram
 C-DAC Silchar

Education and training
C-DAC provides several courses in the field of advanced computing and software development. Among these are the HPC certification course- C-DAC Certified HPC Professional Certification Programme (CCHPCP). C-DAC organises advanced computing diploma programs through the Advanced Computing Training School (ACTS) located all over India. The PG Diploma courses include

 Specialisations in Embedded System Design, 
 VLSI, 
 Big Data Analytics,
 Geoinformatics, 
 Artificial Intelligence

C-DAC has also established Centres of Excellence in Information Technology (CEIT) abroad under the Ministry of External Affairs' s development partnership projects.

Products and developments
 PARAM series of supercomputers
 VEGA Microprocessors, India's first indigenous 64-bit Multi-core Superscalar Out-of-Order RISC-V Processor
 M-Kavach 2, an android-based mobile device security solution addressing emerging threats.
 Mobile Seva AppStore, a mobile app marketplace
 Bharat Operating System Solutions, a Linux-based general purpose operating system
 Anvaya, a workflow environment for automated genome analysis.
 Namescape, the search engine for the Aadhaar unique-ID project.
 GARUDA, India's National Grid Computing Initiative
 TaxoGrid, a grid-based molecular phylogenetics and drug discovery system
 GIST, Graphics and Intelligence based Script Technology
 DARPAN, a real time network monitoring, visualization and Service Level Agreement monitoring tool.
 OLabs, an internet based platform for conduct of school laboratory experiments and assessment.
 Punarjjani, a web based integrated assessment tool for mentally challenged children.
 Shrutlekhan-Rajbhasha, a Hindi language speech recognition software application developed by C-DAC in collaboration with IBM
e-Pramaan, a national e-Authentication framework for accessing various government services.
QSim, India's first Quantum Computer Simulator Toolkit in collaboration with IISc Bengaluru and IIT Roorkee.
CerviSCAN, a Cervical Cancer screening device suite

Notable researchers and alumnus
 Vijay P. Bhatkar, founding director, recipient of Padma Bhushan award
 Rajkumar Buyya, professor at Melbourne University, formerly worked as a Senior Scientist at C-DAC Bangalore
 Srinivasan Ramani, contributed in bringing the internet to India in 1987 through the academic network ERNET, served as an adviser on UN ICT Task Force, and was the first director of HP Labs, India
 Sudhir P. Mudur, former director of C-DAC, current head of Computer Science Department, Concordia University.
 T M Vijayaraman, head of Persistent Systems's research, formerly worked at C-DAC Mumbai.
 Geetha Manjunath, founder & CEO of NIRAMAI.
 P Sadanandan, former director of NCSDT (now C-DAC Mumbai).

Notable awards and accolades
 Manthan Award 2013 for Mobile Tele-Ophthalmology Units, e-safeT, ONAMA.
 Manthan Award 2012 for Interactive Museum, Megh Sushrut, National e-Governance Service Delivery Gateway.
 National Award for the Empowerment of Persons with Disabilities, 2012
 Skoch Digital Inclusion Award, 2011

Other projects
 e-mahashabdkosh

See also
 Supercomputing in India

References

Research institutes in Pune
Information technology organisations based in India
1988 establishments in Maharashtra
Research institutes established in 1988